Esra Şencebe (born 21 December 1981) is a Turkish former professional basketball player.

Honors
Turkish Women's Basketball League
Winners (3): 2003-04, 2005–06, 2012–13
Runners-up (3): 2004-05, 2007–08, 2009–10
Turkish Cup
Winners (4): 2003-04, 2004–05, 2005–06, 2009–10
Turkish Presidents Cup
Winners (3): 2003-04, 2004–05, 2007–08
Runners-up (1): 2005-06
EuroCup Women
Winners (1): 2008-09
FIBA SuperCup
Runners-up (1): 2009

References

External links
Profile at tbl.org.tr

1981 births
Living people
Beşiktaş women's basketball players
Fenerbahçe women's basketball players
Galatasaray S.K. (women's basketball) players
Panküp TED Kayseri Koleji basketball players
Sportspeople from Malatya
Shooting guards
Turkish women's basketball players